This glossary of geology is a list of definitions of terms and concepts relevant to geology, its sub-disciplines, and related fields. For other terms related to the Earth sciences, see Glossary of geography terms.

A

B

C

D

E

F

G

H

I

J

K

L

M

N

O

P

Q

R

S

T

U

V

W

X

Y

Z

See also

Outline of geology
Index of geology articles
Glossary of geography terms

References

External links
 

 
Glossaries of science
Wikipedia glossaries using description lists